Kraśniów  is a village in the administrative district of Gmina Opatowiec, within Kazimierza County, Świętokrzyskie Voivodeship, in south-central Poland.

Notable people
Paulo Dybala, Argentine footballer, through his paternal grandfather.

References

Villages in Kazimierza County